Kipp or Kipps may refer to:

People

Given name 
 Kipp Hamilton (1934–1981), American actress, singer and model
 Kipp Lennon (born 1960), American musician
 Kipp Marcus (born 1970), American actor, producer, screenwriter, and digital media executive
 Kipp Vickers (born 1969), former American football offensive guard

Surname 
Annika Kipp (born 1979), German radio and television presenter
George Washington Kipp (1847–1911), American politician
Karl-Heinz Kipp (1924–2017), German entrepreneur
Lyman Kipp (1929–2014), American sculptor and painter
Maria Kipp (1900–1988), German textile designer and engineer
Petrus Jacobus Kipp (1808–1864), Dutch chemist

Other uses
 Knowledge Is Power Program, a US network of college-preparatory schools
 Kipp's apparatus or Kipp generator, a piece of laboratory glassware used for generating gases from a chemical reaction
 Kipp, Kansas, a small community in the US
 KIPP, a fictional character in Christopher Nolan's film Interstellar
 Kipp, Alberta, a locality in Canada

See also
 Kip (disambiguation)
 Kipps (disambiguation)